R'n'G are a Dutch hip hop duo, founded in 1996. Its members are rapper Ricardo Overman and singer/rapper Jerrel Koningsverdraag (Jay Delano). They were part of the Bravo All Stars charity group who recorded "Let the Music Heal Your Soul" in 1998 that peaked at #36 on the UK Singles Chart.

Studio albums
The Year of R'n'G (1998) cover and info (Poland: Gold)
The Right Time (2001) cover and info
Generations (2006) cover and info

Singles

Videos
"Here Comes the Sun" (1997) - 
"Rhythm of My Heart" (1997) - 
"Open Up Your Mind" (1998) - 
"Can't U Ce?" (1998) - 
"I Love Your Smile" (1998) - 
"Darlin'...I Think About You" (1998) - 
"We'll Be Together" featuring Natalia Kukulska (1998) - 
"Can't Talk About It" (1998) - 
"Children of the World" (1998)
"Tequila" / "I Wish I Could" (1999) - 
"Are U Ready?" (2000) - 
"Don't Give Up" (2001)
"Miracle" (2001) - 
"Radio Heartbeat" (2005) - 
"I'm in Love" / "Ochie Walla" featuring Chicanoz (2006) -

See also
Bravo All Stars
Cosmopop

References

Dutch hip hop groups
People from Eindhoven